The women's 78 kg category in judo at the 2012 Olympic Games in London took place between 28 July and 2 August at the ExCeL Exhibition Centre.

The gold and silver medals were determined by a single-elimination tournament, with the winner of the final taking gold and the loser receiving silver. Judo events awarded two bronze medals. Quarter-final losers competed in a repechage match for the right to face a semi-final loser for a bronze medal (that is, the judokas defeated in quarter-finals 'A' and 'B' competed against each other, with the winner of that match facing the semi-final loser from the other half of the bracket).

Kayla Harrison, representing the United States, won the gold medal, defeating Great Britain's Gemma Gibbons in the final; Gibbons was awarded the silver medal.

Results
The event took place on 2 August 2012, with the following results:

Finals

Repechages

Pool A

Pool B

Pool C

Pool D

References

External links
 

W78
Judo at the Summer Olympics Women's Half Heavyweight
Olympics W78
Women's events at the 2012 Summer Olympics